Juárez station may refer to:

Juárez metro station, in Mexico City
Juárez light rail station, in Guadalajara, Jalisco
Juárez (Mexico City Metrobús, Line 3), a Bus Rapid Transit station in Mexico City
Juárez (Mexico City Metrobús, Line 4), a Bus Rapid Transit station in Mexico City
San Nicolás metro station, in Monterrey, formerly named Juárez

See also
Juárez (disambiguation)